FitzGeorge or Fitzgeorge is an English and Norman French surname, and may refer to:

Surname 
 Adolphus FitzGeorge (1846–1922), Royal Navy officer
 Augustus FitzGeorge (1847–1933), British Army officer
 George FitzGeorge (1843–1907), British Army officer
 Olga FitzGeorge (1877–1928), English socialite and businessperson
 Rosa Frederica Baring FitzGeorge (1854–1927), English socialite
 Sarah Fairbrother, known as Mrs. FitzGeorge (1814–1890), English actress and wife of Prince George, Duke of Cambridge
 Victor FitzGeorge-Balfour (1913–1994), British Army officer

Given name 
 George FitzGeorge Hamilton (1898–1918), British Army officer
 Richard Fitzgeorge de Stacpoole, 1st Duke de Stacpoole (1787–1848), Anglo-French aristocrat

English-language surnames
 
Norman-language surnames
Patronymic surnames
Surnames from given names